The Kolkata–Patna Express was an Express train belonging to Eastern Railway zone that ran between  and  in India. It operated with 13131/13132 train numbers on daily basis. Eastern Railway cancelled its operations permanently from 19 May 2020.

Service

The 13131/Kolkata–Patna Express had average speed of 44 km/hr and covered 548 km in 12h 35m. 13132/Patna–Kolkata Express had average speed of 39 km/hr and covered 548 km in 14h 10m.

Route and halts 

The important halts of the train were:

Coach composition

The train had standard ICF rakes with max speed of 110 kmph. The train consisted of 18 coaches :

 3 AC III Tier
 4 Sleeper coaches
 7 General
 2 Seating cum Luggage Rake

Traction

Both trains were hauled by an Asansol Loco Shed based WAM-4 or WAG-5P electric locomotive from Kolkata to Patna and vice versa.

See also 

 Kolkata railway station
 Patna Junction railway station
 Kolkata Shalimar–Patna Duronto Express
 Kolkata–Patna Garib Rath Express

Notes

References

External links 

 13131/Kolkata–Patna Express
 13132/Patna–Kolkata Express

Transport in Kolkata
Transport in Patna
Express trains in India
Rail transport in West Bengal
Rail transport in Jharkhand
Rail transport in Bihar
Railway services introduced in 2014